A bayong is a kind of bag originating in the Philippines and made by weaving dried leaves. The leaves used for making the bayong vary but the traditional bayong is made from buri leaves in the Visayas and pandan leaves in Luzon. Abaca, bacbac, karagumoy, sabutan, romblon and tikog are among other organic materials used in making the bayong — all of which are derived from plants native to the Philippines. Plastic strips are also used as synthetic substitute for leaves.

The use of bayongs is common among Filipinos going to wet markets especially in rural areas or provinces. Recently the bayong is being promoted as an environmentally-friendly alternative to plastic shopping bags.

Other design
Some part of the Philippines such as Mindanao traditionally uses a plastic version or twine some times''.

References

External link

Bags
Philippine handicrafts